The High Commissioner of the United Kingdom to the Republic of Rwanda is the United Kingdom's foremost diplomatic representative in Rwanda.

The British Embassy in Kigali opened in 1995. On Rwanda's accession to the Commonwealth in 2009, the Embassy became the British High Commission and the ambassador became the High Commissioner. The High Commission is located in the Kacyiru area of Kigali, immediately opposite the Laico Umubano Hotel.

The British High Commissioner to Rwanda is also non-resident Ambassador to the Republic of Burundi, with a liaison office in Bujumbura.

List of heads of mission

Ambassadors
1996–1998: Kaye Oliver
1998–2001: Graeme Loten
2001–2004: Sue Hogwood
2004–2008: Jeremy Macadie
2008–2009: Nicholas Cannon

High Commissioners
2009–2011: Nicholas Cannon
2011–2014: Benedict Llewellyn-Jones
2014–2017: William Gelling

2018–: Joanne Lomas

External links
UK and Rwanda, gov.uk

References

Rwanda
 
United Kingdoms